The Ohio State Buckeyes college football team competes as part of the National Collegiate Athletic Association (NCAA) Division I Football Bowl Subdivision, representing the Ohio State University in the East Division of the Big Ten Conference.  Ohio State has played their home games at Ohio Stadium in Columbus, Ohio since 1922.

The Buckeyes claim eight national championships along with 38 conference championships and ten undefeated seasons (six perfect seasons).  Ohio State is second among all Big Ten programs in terms of conference championships (38) and has an overall record of 468-171-24 in conference play.  With 924 wins in over 130 seasons of football, Ohio State ranks Second among all programs in terms of total wins and is First all-time in Winning percentage in the NCAA.

Football was introduced to the university by George Cole and Alexander S. Lilley in 1890.  Lilley led the Buckeyes to a record of three wins and five losses over his two seasons as head coach.  Ohio State was a football independent from 1890 to 1901 before joining the Ohio Athletic Conference (OAC) as a charter member in 1902. The Buckeyes won two conference championships while members of the OAC and in 1913 became members of the Big Ten Conference.   The school saw its first real success in football and in the Big Ten under head coach John Wilce, who spent sixteen years at the university and won three conference championships, with a Rose Bowl appearance in 1921. Ohio State won two more Big Ten titles under head coach Francis Schmidt and won their first national championship in 1942 under head coach Paul Brown.

Following World War II, Ohio State saw sparse success on the football field with three separate coaches and in 1951 hired Woody Hayes to coach the team.  Under his guidance Ohio State won thirteen Big Ten championships and national championships in 1954, 1957, 1961, 1968 and 1970. During his tenure Ohio State appeared in the Rose Bowl eight times, with the Buckeyes winning four of them.  Following Hayes' dismissal in 1978, Earl Bruce became the head coach, leading the Buckeyes to a conference championship and a Rose Bowl appearance in his first season.  Bruce coached for the Buckeyes from 1979 to 1987 and was replaced in 1988 by John Cooper.  Under Cooper and Bruce the Buckeyes won seven conference championships.  Jim Tressel was hired as head coach in 2001 and quickly gave Ohio State its seventh national championship in 2002 with a win in the Fiesta Bowl.  Ohio State won seven Big Ten championships under Tressel and appeared in eight Bowl Championship Series games, winning five of them.

In his debut as head coach, Urban Meyer led the program to an undefeated 2012 season, and two years later to their eighth national championship in the 2014 season. Through the 2019 season, Ohio State has compiled an official overall record of 924 wins, 326 losses and 53 ties, and has appeared in 50 bowl games, with the most recent coming in 2019 Fiesta Bowl.

Ohio State is the only program in college football history to have never lost more than seven games in a single season.

Seasons

All-time records
Records current through 2021.

Notes

References

Ohio State

Ohio State Buckeyes football seasons